Stuart Henry may refer to:

 Stuart Henry (DJ) (1942–1995), British disc jockey
 Stuart Henry (criminologist) (born 1949), professor of criminal justice
 Stuart Henry (politician) (born 1946), Australian politician

See also
 Henry Stuart (disambiguation)